Anagarika Dharmapala Srimathano is a 2015 Sri Lankan Sinhala biographical history film directed by Sanath Abeysekara and co-produced by Ven. Banagala Upatissa Thera and Sunil T. Fernando for Sunil T. Films. It stars Palitha Silva in lead role along with Lucky Dias and Sriyantha Mendis. Music composed by Rohana Weerasinghe. It is the 1211th Sri Lankan film in the Sinhala cinema.

The film reveals about the life of Sri Lanka's Anagarika Dharmapala, a founding contributor of non-violent Sinhalese Buddhist nationalism and Buddhism.

Plot

Cast
 Palitha Silva as Anagarika Dharmapala
 Lucky Dias  as News editor Piyadasa Sirisena
 Sriyantha Mendis as Wijewardena
 Hyacinth Wijeratne as Mallika Dharmagunawardhana
 G.R Perera as Manamperi
 Madhava Wijesinghe as Reporter
 Sandun Wijesiri as English railway chief
 Dayasiri Hettiarachchi
 Gayan Wickramathilaka
 Kriz Chris Henri Harriz as Government agent
 Prasad Samarathunga
 Ruwangi Ratnayake as Reporter
 Sanjaya Amarasinghe

Soundtrack

References

External links
 ධර්මපාල ශ්‍රීමතාණන් වෙනුවෙන් සුනිල් - සනත් – පාලිත - සම්මාන ලබති

2014 films
2010s Sinhala-language films
Sri Lankan historical films
2010s historical films